Cotai Water Jet is a  company that operates high-speed ferry services between the Special Administrative Regions of Macau and Hong Kong. It is one of the two companies operating high-speed ferry services between the two territories - the other one being TurboJET.

The Taipa Ferry Terminal in Macau is used by this ferry route to enable easy access to The Venetian Macao in Cotai, although it is also chosen by some because of its proximity to Taipa, Cotai and Coloane in comparison to the Outer Harbour Ferry Terminal (Terminal Marítimo) used by TurboJET on the Macau Peninsula. The Cotai Water Jet is a subsidiary of Las Vegas Sands.

Cotai Water Jet has been assigned the two-letter airline code 8C by IATA, used for routes to/from Hong Kong International Airport only, where passengers must continue to other destinations (or vice versa) by air.

Current routes

 Taipa Ferry Terminal, Macau ↔  Hong Kong–Macau Ferry Terminal, Hong Kong
 Taipa Ferry Terminal, Macau ↔  Hong Kong China Ferry Terminal, Hong Kong
 Taipa Ferry Terminal, Macau ↔  Skypier, Hong Kong International Airport, Chek Lap Kok, Hong Kong
 Outer Harbour Ferry Terminal, Macau ↔  Hong Kong–Macau Ferry Terminal, Hong Kong

Fleet
Cotai Water Jet's fleet are built by Austal Shipyard of Australia.

Brand of vessels
Austal 48: 47.5m length, 70 (net) tonnes, 411/413/417 passengers catamaran. Propelled by waterjets powered by quadruple MTU 16V 4000 M70 diesel engines, rated at 2320 kW each. Cruising speed at 42 knots. Built by Austal Shipyard of Australia.

List of vessels
There are all together 14 vessels:
 THE GRAND CANAL SHOPPES
 THE VENETIAN
 THE COTAI STRIP EXPO
 SHOPPES COTAI CENTRAL
 COTAI CENTRAL
 SHOPPES FOUR SEASONS
 THE PLAZA
 COTAI STRIP COTAIARENA (Sold, and shipped to Busan, Korea in August 2022)
 COTAI STRIP COTAIGOLD (Sold, and shipped to Busan, Korea in September 2022)
 GOURMET DINING
 MARCO POLO
 ST. MARK
 CASTELLA SQUARE (Sold, and shipped to Split, Croatia in February 2022)
 DI MODA SQUARE

Rented vessels (all returned in early 2009)
Lian Shan Hu: 39.5m length, 338 passengers catamaran. Propelled by waterjets powered by twin MTU 16V 396 TE 74L diesel engines, rated at 1580 kW each. Maximum speed at 32 knots. Built by Austal Shipyard of Australia.
Nan Gui: 40.1m length, 338 passengers catamaran. Propelled by waterjets powered by twin MTU 16V 396 TE 74L diesel engines, rated at 1825 kW each. Maximum speed at 32 knots. Built by Austal Shipyard of Australia.

Ticketing offices

This is a list where passengers can buy tickets to Cotai Water Jet.

Macau

The Venetian Macao
 Cotai Travel (Shop1028)
 Concierge Desk (Hotel Lobby, Level 1)
 Concierge Desk (Hotel West Lobby, Level 1)
 Cotai Ticketing™ North and South Box Offices (Cotai Arena™, Level 1)
 Customer service counter (Di Moda Street at The Grand Canal Shoppes)
 Cotai Ticketing Call Center (Macau: +853 2882 8818 / Hong Kong: +852 6333 6660)

Sands Macao
 Guest Services Counter, Ground Level

Sands Cotai Central
 CotaiTravel (Shop1030)
 Concierge Counter (Conrad Macao Lobby, Cotai Central)
 Concierge Counter (Holiday Inn Macao Lobby, Cotai Central)
 Concierge Desk (Sheraton Macao Hotel Main Lobby, Cotai Central)
 CotaiTicketing™ Box Office (Holiday Inn)
 CotaiTicketing™ Box Office (Sheraton Hotel)

Taipa Ferry Terminal
 Cotai Water Jet Ticketing Counter (Departure Hall)

Hong Kong

Sheung Wan
 Shop 305D Shun Tak Centre, 200 Connaught Road, Sheung Wan, HK

Tsim Sha Tsui
 Shop No.7, 1/F China Ferry Terminal, 33 Canton Road, Tsim Sha Tsui, Kowloon

Hong Kong International Airport
 Transfer Area E2, Level 5, Hong Kong International Airport Passenger Terminal Building One

Accidents
On 29 August 2009, a Cotai Water Jet bumped into a giant buoy and broke the catamaran windows with 1 injured.
On 4 September 2009, THE VENETIAN collided with a sampan at Zhuhai waters killing 1 person.
On 25 December 2009, COTAIGOLD collided with a Hong Kong fishing boat in Zhuhai waters near Lantau Island with 9 injured. The left bow of the catamaran was crushed and repaired later.

References

External links

Water transport in Hong Kong
Water transport in Macau
2007 establishments in Macau